There are two species of skink named Fraser's Hill forest skink:
 Tytthoscincus bukitensis, endemic to Peninsular Malaysia
 Tytthoscincus kakikecil, endemic to Malaysia